Gilles de Noailles, abbé de l'Isle (1524–1600) was French Ambassador to the Ottoman Empire from 1575 to 1579. He was the brother of his predecessor as ambassador, François de Noailles, and was succeeded by Jacques de Germigny. He was sent to the Ottoman Empire by Henry III of France.

Gilles was one of three brothers who served as French diplomats, three of the nineteen children of Louis de Noailles and Catherine de Pierre-Buffière. Gilles became Bishop of Dax after the death of his brother François. Gilles' other offices included; Master of Requests, Parliamentary Councillor for Bordeaux, and Ambassador (or French agent) in Poland and in England during the crisis of the Scottish Reformation.

In October 1556, he was the French agent in London and was recalled to Paris when his brother, newly made the Bishop of Dax was sent as ambassador. He was surprised to find his landlord charging him rent, having expected Mary Tudor to pay.

November 1559
Noailles was the resident diplomat in London during the Scottish Reformation, his secretary was Bertrand de Salignac de la Mothe-Fénelon. He wrote to the Cardinal of Lorraine that Elizabeth I of England celebrated All Saints Day, 1 November 1559, at Westminster Abbey with candles and a crucifix at the altar, which surprised the Protestants of London. He wondered if this signalled her intention to marry a Catholic prince, and thought the Scottish Protestants would not then find favour with her. In the same week both he and the Spanish Ambassador pretended to be ill to avoid the Lord Mayor's Banquet in case they were embarrassed by their relative precedence. At the end of November, Noailles also wrote to the Cardinal's sister, Mary of Guise in Scotland, explaining that her rebel Scottish lords had agreed with Elizabeth that the Earl of Arran would become King of Scotland as a vassal of England. He added that he thought it unlikely that Elizabeth would marry anyone.

Mission to Scotland
Charles IX of France sent Gilles to Scotland in 1561, his letter of credence was countersigned by Catherine de Medici. He was sent to the Parliament of Scotland to declare the willingness of Mary, Queen of Scots to forgive past offences during the Reformation and show her love, expecting their obedience in return. Mary and the French King wished the Auld Alliance to continue. Gilles arrived at Edinburgh escorted by Lord Seton and 120 horsemen on 11 March 1561. He simply delivered his public message and left, according to the English diplomat Thomas Randolph offending no-one except that he refused to take a drink at his departure. The Scots refused to pay his expenses citing a clause of the Treaty of Edinburgh that no foreigner should hold office in Scotland.

See also
 Franco-Ottoman alliance

References

Ambassadors of France to the Ottoman Empire
1524 births
1600 deaths
16th-century French people
Gilles
Scottish Reformation
16th-century French diplomats